The 23rd Field Artillery Battalion was a field artillery battalion of the regular Army, constituted as a US-manned unit in 1921, but redesignated as a Philippine Scouts unit in 1930.

History

Lineage
Constituted 16 August 1921 in the Regular Army as the 1st Battalion, 23d Field Artillery.
Redesignated on 1 January 1930 as 1st Battalion 23d Field Artillery (Philippine Scouts).
Battery A activated 1 March 1936 in the Philippine Islands; remainder of battalion 14 March 1941.  By July 1941 the regiment still fielded only a single battalion of artillery with 10 officers and 391 enlisted men and was armed with the obsolete 2.95-inch mountain guns (pack).
 Surrendered 6 May 1942 to the Japanese forces in the Philippines Islands.
Reorganized and redesignated 23d Field Artillery Battalion (Philippine Scouts) and assigned to the 12th Infantry Division 6 April 1946
Inactivated 30 April 1947 in the Philippine Islands. (2d Battalion, 23d Field Artillery consolidated with the 23d Field Artillery Battalion in 1949.
Disbanded 25 March 1952.

Campaign streamers
World War II
 Philippine Islands

Decorations
 Presidential Unit Citation, Streamer embroidered BATAAN
 Presidential Unit Citation, Streamer embroidered LUZON 1941-1942
 Presidential Unit Citation, Streamer embroidered DEFENSE OF THE PHILIPPINES
 Presidential Unit Citation, Streamer embroidered 7 DECEMBER 1941 TO 10 MAY 1942

Current units
unit broken up

Coat of arms
none
 The 7th Field Artillery Observation Battalion's coat of arms was reassigned to the 23rd in 1955.

See also
 Field Artillery Branch (United States)
 U.S. Army Regimental System

References

  lineage

External links
 http://www.history.army.mil/html/forcestruc/lineages/branches/av/default.htm

Field artillery regiments of the United States Army
Military units and formations established in 1921